Ljubno is a village in the Municipality of Radovljica in the Upper Carniola region of Slovenia.

Church

The church in Ljubno is dedicated to Mary Help of Christians. It stands in the northern part of the village and dates from around 1600. It has a rectangular barrel-vaulted stuccoed nave and a chancel walled on three sides.

References

External links

Ljubno at Geopedia

Populated places in the Municipality of Radovljica